Thrissur is one of the  six major cities in the state of Kerala, India. Thrissur city, being home to several cultural, literary and other institutions like Kerala Sahitya Academy and Kerala Sangeetha Nadaka Academy is nicknamed the Cultural Capital of Kerala.  The City is also home to several monuments having great historical significance. The City is also associated with several rulers of the erstwhile Kingdom of Cochin.

List of the Thrissur Corporation wards and Councillors
The following is the list of the wards and the respective Corporation Councillors of Thrissur Municipal Corporation after the elections to the local self-government bodies in Kerala held in December 2020.

References

External links
Official website of Thrissur Corporation
Official website of Thrissur District

 
 
Thrissur Corporation wards